The 2009 Mont-Saint-Michel municipal election took place on November 1, 2009, to elect a mayor and councillors in Mont-Saint-Michel, Quebec. Incumbent mayor Roger Lapointe was re-elected to another term without opposition.

Results

Source: Résultants 2009, Affaires municipales, Régions et Occupation du territoire Québec.

References

2009 Quebec municipal elections